Parashorea chinensis is a large species of tree (up to 80 m tall) in the family Dipterocarpaceae. It is native to southern China (Yunnan and Guangxi provinces) and in northern Laos and Vietnam. It is threatened by habitat loss. The species is under first-class national protection in China.

References

chinensis
Trees of China
Trees of Laos
Trees of Vietnam
Taxonomy articles created by Polbot
Plants described in 1977